Christopher Shea Nickell (born  1958/1959) is an American lawyer from Kentucky who is an associate justice of the Kentucky Supreme Court.

Education 

Nickell, a native of Paducah, Kentucky, graduated from the city's Paducah Tilghman High School in 1977, followed by a Bachelor of Arts from DePauw University in 1981 and a Juris Doctor from the University of Kentucky College of Law in 1984.

Legal career 

Prior to being appointed as a judge, he practiced law for 22 years.

State court service 

In 2006, Nickell was elected to be a Judge of the Kentucky Court of Appeals.

Kentucky Supreme Court service 

On February 6, 2019, Nickell announced he was running for the seat on the Kentucky Supreme Court vacated by the retirement of Bill Cunningham. He was elected on November 5, 2019, defeating state senator Whitney Westerfield. He was sworn into office on December 11, 2019.

Teaching 

He served as an instructor at Murray State University teaching Insurance and Risk Management and he also taught at the University of North Carolina at Chapel Hill teaching jurisprudence.

Associations and memberships 

He has been a member of the  Paducah Lions Club since 1989. He is also an Eagle Scout, he has been recognized as a Kentucky Colonel, Honorary Captain of the Belle of Louisville and a Sagamore of the Wabash. He is a Life Sponsor of Ducks Unlimited. He is also a 32 Degree Mason, a Silver Life Member of the National Association for the Advancement of Colored People, a Life Fellow of the Kentucky Bar Foundation, a Gideon, and a deacon at Paducah's Heartland Church.

Personal life 

Nickell and his wife, Carolyn S. Watson are both a Melvin Jones Fellow.

Electoral history

References

External links 

1950s births
Living people
20th-century American lawyers
21st-century American judges
21st-century American lawyers
Baptists from Kentucky
DePauw University alumni
Judges of the Kentucky Court of Appeals
Kentucky lawyers
Justices of the Kentucky Supreme Court
Murray State University faculty
Paducah Tilghman High School alumni
People from Paducah, Kentucky
University of Kentucky College of Law alumni
University of North Carolina at Chapel Hill faculty